The Boy Next Door is a 2003 album by jazz singer Stacey Kent. The songs were chosen to reflect male singers that Kent admires.

Reception

David Jeffries, reviewed the album for AllMusic and wrote that "With a gentle conviction akin to early Blossom Dearie without the cheeky flair, the album makes for breezy listening. ...individual moments of warm openhearted excellence make it worthwhile.". Jeffries highlighted Kent's performances on "Bookends" and "'Tis Autumn", and reserved praise for drummer Matt Home. Jeffries described the guitarist Colin Oxley's solo "Too Darn Hot" as the album's "greatest moment".

Track listing

Musicians
 Stacey Kent - vocals
 Jim Tomlinson – saxophones, backing vocals
 Curtis Schwartz - backing vocals
 Colin Oxley - guitar
 David Newton – piano, keyboards, backing vocals
 Dave Chamberlain – double bass
 Matt Home - drums

References

2001 albums
Stacey Kent albums
Candid Records albums